Juan de Dios Correa de Saa (born 1801–1877) was a Chilean politician and military officer who served as President of the Senate of Chile.

External links
 Profile at The Annals of the Republic of Chile

1801 births
1877 deaths
Chilean people
Chilean politicians
Presidents of the Senate of Chile